Ngwo (Ngwɔ) is a Southern Bantoid language of Cameroon. The Konda and Basa varieties are perhaps divergent enough to be considered distinct languages.

References

Various recordings of Ngwo in the UCLA Phonetics Lab Archive

Momo languages
Languages of Cameroon